Lodi is an unincorporated community in Humphreys County, Mississippi, United States.

Notes

Unincorporated communities in Humphreys County, Mississippi
Unincorporated communities in Mississippi